Multicalycidae is a family of trematodes in the order Aspidogastrida. It consists of one genus, Multicalyx Faust & Tang, 1936.

Species
Multicalyx cristata Faust & Tang, 1936
Multicalyx elegans (Olsson, 1869)

References

Further reading
Thoney, D. A. & Burreson, E. M. (1988). Revision of the Multicalycidae (Aspidocotylea) with comments on postlarval development. Proceedings of the Helminthological Society of Washington, 55(1), 62–67.

Aspidogastrea
Trematode families